The properties of the Holy See are regulated by the 1929 Lateran Treaty signed with the Kingdom of Italy. Although part of Italian territory, some of them enjoy extraterritoriality similar to those of foreign embassies.

Outside Vatican City but inside Rome

Extraterritorial property 
Archbasilica of Saint John Lateran (Arcibasilica di San Giovanni in Laterano)
Basilica of Saint Mary Major (Basilica di Santa Maria Maggiore)
Basilica of Saint Paul Outside the Walls (Basilica di San Paolo fuori le Mura) (the complex includes also the Benedictine monastery, the Pontifical Oratory of San Paolo and the Pontifical Beda College).
Lateran Palace, Lateran University, the Scala Santa and adjoining buildings, 
Palace of St Callixtus (Palazzo San Callisto) - home of the Pontifical Council Cor Unum.
Certain buildings on the Gianicolo Hill, namely the Pontifical Urbaniana University, the Pontifical North American College, and the Bambino Gesù Hospital.
Palazzo della Cancelleria between the Corso Vittorio Emanuele II and Campo de' Fiori.
Palazzo di Propaganda Fide (the Palace of the Congregation for the Evangelization of Peoples) in the Piazza di Spagna.
Palace of the Holy Office - home of the Congregation for the Doctrine of the Faith in the Piazza del Sant'Uffizio and adjacent to the Basilica of St. Peter.
Palace of the Congregation for the Oriental Churches (formerly Palazzo dei Convertendi in Piazza Scossacavalli), in Via della Conciliazione (rione of Borgo)
Palazzo Pio in Via della Conciliazione (in exchange for Palazzo della Dataria)
Palace of the Vicariate (also called Palazzo Maffei Marescotti) in Via della Pigna off the Corso Vittorio Emanuele II near the Piazza del Gesù
 Pontifical Minor Roman Seminary
Campo Santo Teutonico
The larger part of Paul VI Audience Hall (the rostrum with the papal throne, however, is part of Vatican territory).
The Jesuit Curia Complex

Non-extraterritorial property 
Palace of the Holy Apostles attached to the Basilica dei Santi Apostoli.
Palace attached to the Church of San Carlo ai Catinari
Collegio Bellarmino in Via del Seminario near the Church of Sant'Ignazio.
Archaeological Institute, Pontifical Oriental Institute, Pontifical Lombard Seminary and the Russian College on Piazza Santa Maria Maggiore.
The two Palaces of Sant'Apollinare between the Piazza Sant'Apollinare and Via della Serola.
The House of Retreat for the Clergy of Saints John and Paul, including the Nympheum of Nero, on the Caelian Hill.

Former extraterritorial property 
Palazzo della Datarìa near the Quirinal Palace (not a property of the Holy See anymore; exchanged for Palazzo Pio)

Outside Rome

Extraterritorial property 
Papal Palace of Castel Gandolfo, the Gardens of the Villa Cybo, Villa Barberini plus adjacent gardens, the summer estate of the Pontificio Collegio Urbano di Propaganda Fide and the papal farm between the towns of Castel Gandolfo and Albano Laziale (around ).
Area of Santa Maria di Galeria, where the antennae of Vatican Radio are located. The area was ceded by Italy to the Holy See in an agreement in 1951.

Non-extraterritorial property 
The Basilica of the Holy House (Santa Casa) at Loreto, Province of Ancona.
The Basilica of St Francis at Assisi, Province of Perugia.
The Basilica of St Anthony at Padua, Province of Padua.
The Vatican Advanced Technology Telescope, Graham County, Arizona, USA.

The Fundamental Accord, signed in 1993, grants property rights and tax exemptions to the Holy See over various Christian holy sites in Israel, but the agreement was never finalized because of diplomatic problems between the Vatican and Israeli governments.

See also 
 Papal States
 Vatican City State
 Index of Vatican City-related articles

References 

 
World Heritage Sites in Italy